Iva Prandzheva (born 15 February 1972 in Plovdiv) is a former Bulgarian athlete who was successful in both long jump and triple jump. She had to retire from athletics in 2000 after she was caught doping for the second time and was subsequently banned for life.

Her best performance came at the 1995 World Championships where she won a silver medal jumping 15.18 metres, a personal best. The winner of the event, Inessa Kravets, set a new world record (15.50 metres) which still stands.

Prandzheva competed at the 1996 Summer Olympics, but failed a blood drug test testing positive to Methandrostenolone and was banned for two years. She came back after the ban and qualified for the 2000 Summer Olympics, but was caught doping again. This time she tested positive for the anabolic steroid Nandrolone and she was subsequently banned from sports for life.

She competed in Survivor BG 2009 and was both the Runner - Up and Main Antagonist.

Achievements

See also 
List of sportspeople sanctioned for doping offences

References

External links 

1972 births
Living people
Bulgarian female triple jumpers
Bulgarian female long jumpers
Athletes (track and field) at the 1996 Summer Olympics
Olympic athletes of Bulgaria
Doping cases in athletics
Bulgarian sportspeople in doping cases
Sportspeople from Plovdiv
World Athletics Championships medalists